Castor Creek is a stream in Alberta, Canada. It is a tributary of the Battle River.

Castor Creek was named from the Latin word meaning "beaver".

See also
List of rivers of Alberta

References

Rivers of Alberta
Tributaries of Hudson Bay